Lil'Jordan Humphrey (born April 19, 1998) is an American football wide receiver for the Denver Broncos of the National Football League (NFL). He played college football at Texas.

Early years
Humphrey attended Carroll Senior High School in Southlake, Texas. He played running back and wide receiver for the Dragons high school football team. He received numerous offers, including from Texas, Wisconsin, California, Iowa, Ole Miss, Oregon State, Texas Tech, UCF, and Washington. He committed to the University of Texas to play college football.

College career
Humphrey played in 10 games as a true freshman at Texas in 2016, recording two receptions for 15 yards. As a sophomore in 2017, he played in 12 games with six starts and had 37 receptions for 431 yards and one touchdown. As a junior, Humphrey had 86 receptions for 1,176 yards and nine touchdowns. After the season, he entered the 2019 NFL Draft.

Collegiate statistics

Professional career

New Orleans Saints
Humphrey was signed by the New Orleans Saints as an undrafted free agent following the 2019 NFL Draft. He was waived on August 31, 2019 and was signed to the practice squad the next day. He was promoted to the active roster on September 18, 2019. He was waived on October 26 and re-signed to the practice squad. He was promoted again to the active roster on December 28, 2019.

On September 5, 2020, Humphrey waived by the Saints and signed to the practice squad the next day. He was placed on the practice squad/injured list on September 30, and restored to the practice squad on December 9. He was elevated to the active roster on December 19, December 24, and January 2, 2021, for the team's weeks 15, 16, and 17 games against the Kansas City Chiefs, Minnesota Vikings, and Carolina Panthers, and reverted to the practice squad after each game. In the Chiefs game, he recorded two catches for 29 yards and his first career touchdown reception during the 32–29 loss. He was elevated again on January 9 for the wild card playoff game against the Chicago Bears, and reverted to the practice squad again following the game. On January 18, 2021, Humphrey signed a reserve/futures contract with the Saints.

On March 16, 2022 it was reported that Humphrey would be returning to the Saints as a restricted free-agent. However, a failed physical voided the Saints offer.

New England Patriots
On June 16, 2022, Humphrey signed a one year deal with the New England Patriots. He was waived on August 30, 2022 and signed to the practice squad the next day. He was promoted to the active roster on September 13. He was waived on October 11 and re-signed to the practice squad. He was elevated to the active roster on October 15, via a standard elevation which caused him to revert back to the practice squad after the game. He was released from the practice squad on November 15, 2022.

Denver Broncos
On March 7, 2023, Humphrey signed with the Denver Broncos.

References

External links
New Orleans Saints bio
Texas Longhorns bio

1998 births
Living people
People from Southlake, Texas
Players of American football from Texas
Sportspeople from the Dallas–Fort Worth metroplex
American football wide receivers
Texas Longhorns football players
New Orleans Saints players
New England Patriots players
Denver Broncos players